Theatre 80 is an Off-Broadway theater located at 80 St. Mark's Place in Manhattan's East Village neighborhood. It is owned and operated by Lorcan Otway, who restored and renovated the building with his father and opened it as a theater in the 1960s. The theater was home to a number of productions, including the 1967 premiere of You're a Good Man, Charlie Brown whose revenue helped the Otways keep the theater. By 1971, it became a movie theater.

Prior to its current status as a cabaret-style theater, the building, which also houses the Museum of the American Gangster, was a nightclub during Prohibition.

The Otways filed for bankruptcy on December 30, 2021, to prevent the sale of the building amid controversy with their mortgage lender. In May 2022, the Otways were told they would have to vacate the theater by August.

References

External links

Off-Broadway theaters
East Village, Manhattan
Buildings and structures in Manhattan